The Lady Becomes a Maid (Swedish: Fröken blir piga) is a 1936 Swedish comedy film directed by Ivar Johansson and starring Hugo Björne, Olga Andersson and Marianne Löfgren.

Cast
 Hugo Björne as 	Rosengren
 Olga Andersson as Mrs. Rosengren
 Marianne Löfgren as	Alva Rosengren
 Ernst Eklund as Karl-Axel Allard
 Erik Rosén as 	Algot Allard
 Hjördis Petterson as Laura Allard
 Carin Swensson as 	Hildegard, maid
 Sten Lindgren as 	Arthur Lundquist
 Kotti Chave as 	Svante Hedelius
 Holger Löwenadler as 	Johan
 Tom Walter as Alfred
 Sven Arvor as 	Maja's brother 
 Knut Frankman as 	Church warden 
 Nils Hallberg as 	Kalle 
 Gerd Mårtensson as 	Girl at the dance
 Siri Olson as Maid 
 Aurore Palmgren as 	Party guest

References

Bibliography 
 Qvist, Per Olov & von Bagh, Peter. Guide to the Cinema of Sweden and Finland. Greenwood Publishing Group, 2000.

External links 
 

1936 films
Swedish comedy films
1936 comedy films
1930s Swedish-language films
Films directed by Ivar Johansson
Swedish black-and-white films
1930s Swedish films